NDRF may refer to:

National Defense Reserve Fleet, consists of "mothballed" ships used to provide shipping for the United States during national emergencies
National Design & Research Forum, a forum of the Institution of Engineers (India)
National Disaster Recovery Framework, a document released by the Federal Emergency Management Agency in the United States
National Disaster Recovery Fund, a disaster recovery fund based in Jamaica
National Disaster Response Force, a disaster response agency of the Republic of India